The Wailoa River State Recreation Area, also known as Wailoa River State Park, is a park in Hilo, on Hawaii Island in the US state of Hawaii. It was developed as a buffer zone following the devastating 1960 tsunami that wiped out the central bayfront district of Hilo.

Description

The name wai loa literally means "long water" in the Hawaiian language. The Wailoa River itself flows just a short distance from Waiākea Pond within the park to the Pacific Ocean.

The park lies between downtown Hilo, Hawaii and Hilo Bay. The Hawaii Belt Road (Route 19, known as Kamehameha Avenue at this point) forms the northern boundary of the park; the land north of Route 19 is the public Hawaii County-run Hilo Bayfront Beach Park. East of the Wailoa River bridge is another county park, Liliuokalani Gardens.

The  park is administered by the Hawaii Department of Land and Natural Resources. It includes a boat ramp and visitor center with cultural displays.
The Wailoa Arts & Cultural Center, founded in 1967, has free admission, but limited hours.

Kamehameha Statue

On display is a Kamehameha Statue (although not the original work by Thomas R. Gould) honoring King Kamehameha I, founder of the Kingdom of Hawaii. The statue was originally commissioned by the Princeville resort on the island of Kauai. However, it was put into storage when the local population pointed out that Kauai was the one major island never conquered by Kamehameha in war. An alumni group from Kamehameha Schools raised funds to transport the statue, and put on display in 1997.

The Royal Order of Kamehameha I objected to the first placement of the statue, pointing out that the shorefront has a history of being devastated by tsunamis.

Memorials
Memorials within the park include monuments to Shinmachi, the Vietnam War, and the Korean War (dedicated in 2019). The Shinmachi Tsunami Memorial also incorporates a floor mural entitled "Submerged Rocks and Water Reflections" by Hawaiian artist Tadashi Sato.

History

Shinmachi

The central bayfront area was settled in 1913 by first-generation immigrants from Japan, who started businesses in Waiākea and named the area Shinmachi ("New Town"). Residents returned and rebuilt, only to have Shinmachi destroyed again by another tsunami on May 23, 1960, following the 1960 Valdivia earthquake. A documentary film about Shinmachi was broadcast on local PBS stations in April 2021.

Project Kaikoo
The Hawaii County Board of Supervisors formed the Hawaii Redevelopment Agency (HRA) on May 31, and passed an ordinance banning further reconstruction in the flooded area. A 5-person Board of Commissioners was appointed on July 14, with Ralph Kiyosaki as the first chairman. HRA decided to permanently relocate Shinmachi rather than rebuild and initiated Project Kaikoo ("rough seas"), completing the acquisition of land and relocation of residents by 1965. Approximately  of oceanfront land would be set aside as a green belt and buffer zone to absorb future tsunamis, including the Wailoa River State Recreation Area.

Plans for Project Kaikoo were approved in March 1961; most businesses agreed to move to public lands zoned for light industrial uses near the airport, but residents were more stubborn and refused relocation. In some cases, land had to be condemned and the property seized.  of volcanic fill were used to create the new commercial center plateau, and the project received a strong endorsement in 1963 when the County decided to build its new center on the elevated site.

References

External links

 
 

Protected areas of Hawaii (island)
State parks of Hawaii
Hilo, Hawaii
Bodies of water of Hawaii (island)
Rivers of Hawaii